is a late 12th-century emakimono (handscroll painting) depicting the events of the Ōtemmon Conspiracy, an event of Japan's early Heian period.

History
It is widely believed that these handscrolls were ordered by the retired Emperor Go-Shirakawa (1127-1192, r. 1155-1158) to pacify the angry spirit of Tomo no Yoshio after the imperial Ōtenmon burnt down during the Kyoto fire in 1177. Regardless of whether the scroll was made as a result of the fire in 1177, it appears that the intention of the scroll is to mollify Tomo no Yoshio’s angry spirit.

Description
The scroll itself depicts the events of the Ōtenmon conspiracy involving Tomo no Yoshio, which occurred on the tenth day of the third month of 866. Tomo no Yoshio’s regret was emphasized in the scrolls through the written text in an attempt to protect against the vengeful will of Tomo no Yoshio’s spirit. 

The full-color painting depicts the events of the 3rd month of 866, in which Ban Dainagon, also known as Tomo no Yoshio, set fire to the Ōtemmon gate of Kyoto. He then blamed one of his political rivals, Minister of the left Minamoto no Makoto for the fire. However, the true culprit was soon discovered, and Tomo no Yoshio was banished to Izu province.

Stylistically, the scroll is interesting because it is done using a combination of the otoko-e and tsukuri-e styles. Calligraphic lines are used to define figures, which characterizes the otoko-e style used in the shigisan-engi scroll. However, thick coats of bright colors are used in some scenes, typical of the tsukuri-e style used in the Genji Monogatari Emaki.

Plot of the three scrolls
Vol. 1 — The first scroll illustrates the burning of the Otemmon gate while people tried to put out the flames, followed by the proof that Makoto was unjustly accused of his actions during the misunderstandings.

Vol. 2 — The Second scroll showcased the consolation to Makoto while he is praying to the gods and Buddha despite the fact that he did not do the actions which he was accused of. After that, they showed the suspicions about Tomo no Yoshio burning the gates. This imagery is rather indirect. It illustrates children arguing in the streets, later joined by their parents to abuse them and then gossiping amongst themselves about Tomo no Yoshio burning the gates. 

Vol. 3 — The Third Scroll displays the arrest of Tomo no Yoshio as he is sent to exile. The picture indicates that Tomo no Yoshio had a servant who accidentally revealed the true culprit to the burning of the gate and after being arrested, he confessed to the police about what happened. The women in his mansion seemed morally weakened as they weep while Tomo no Yoshio is being taken to exile by the police in an ox cart.

See also
List of National Treasures of Japan (paintings)

Notes

References
Frederic, Louis (2002). "Japan Encyclopedia." Cambridge, Massachusetts: Harvard University Press.
Mason, Penelope (2005). "History of Japanese Art." 2nd ed, rev. by Dinwiddie, Donald. Upper Saddle River, New Jersey: Pearson Education Inc.

Japanese paintings
12th-century paintings
History of art in Japan
Emakimono